Benny Golson's New York Scene is the debut album by saxophonist Benny Golson featuring performances recorded in late 1957 and originally released on the Contemporary label.

Reception

John S. Wilson's contemporaneous review was positive, noting that both quintet and nonet bands feature "Farmer playing with broad authority no matter what the fare at hand while Golson's warm, dark lines flare and glide through all the pieces." Scott Yanow of Allmusic stated, "this underrated gem served as a strong start to Benny Golson's influential solo career".

Track listing
All compositions by Benny Golson except as indicated.

 "Something in B flat" (Ray Bryant) - 6:04    
 "Whisper Not" - 6:01    
 "Step Lightly" - 6:54    
 "Just by Myself" - 4:12    
 "Blues It" - 6:52    
 "You're Mine, You" (Johnny Green, Edward Heyman) - 4:22    
 "Capri" (Gigi Gryce) - 3:59  
 "B.G.'s Holiday" - 5:34 Bonus track on CD

Personnel
Benny Golson - tenor saxophone
Art Farmer - trumpet
Jimmy Cleveland - trombone  (tracks 2, 4 & 7)
Julius Watkins - French horn (tracks 2, 4 & 7)
Gigi Gryce - alto saxophone (tracks 2, 4 & 7) 
Sahib Shihab - baritone saxophone (tracks 2, 4 & 7)
Wynton Kelly - piano
Paul Chambers - bass
Charlie Persip - drums

References 

Contemporary Records albums
Benny Golson albums
1959 debut albums
Albums produced by Nat Hentoff